Daniel Šebesta (born 24 October 1991) is a professional Slovak footballer who last played for II. Liga club Skalica as an attacking midfielder.

Club career

MFK Skalica
He made his professional Fortuna Liga debut for MFK Skalica against Zemplín Michalovce on 25 July 2015.

References

External links
 MFK Skalica profile
 
 Futbalnet profile
 Eurofotbal profile

1991 births
Living people
Slovak footballers
Association football midfielders
MFK Skalica players
2. Liga (Slovakia) players